Lokenath Mishra (1905-1975) was an Indian politician. He was elected to the Lok Sabha, the lower house of the Parliament of India as a member of the Indian National Congress. He was earlier a member of the Constituent Assembly of India from Odisha.

References

External links
 Official biographical sketch in Parliament of India website

1905 births
1975 deaths
Lok Sabha members from Odisha
India MPs 1952–1957
Indian National Congress politicians from Odisha
Members of the Constituent Assembly of India
People from Puri